Vuk Radojević (born 1978) is an agrarian economist and politician in Serbia. He was the mayor of Bečej from 2012 to 2016 and served as minister of agriculture, water management, and forestry in the Government of Vojvodina from 2016 to 2020. Radojević is a member of the Serbian Progressive Party.

Early life and private career
Radojević was born in Bečej, in what was then the Socialist Autonomous Province of Vojvodina in the Socialist Republic of Serbia, Socialist Federal Republic of Yugoslavia. He was raised in the community and subsequently earned a bachelor's degree (2002), master's degree (2007), and Ph.D. (2018) from the University of Novi Sad's Faculty of Agriculture, focusing on the field of agro-economy. His master's thesis considered export opportunities of agro-industrial products to the European Union.

Politician
Radojević sought election to the Assembly of Vojvodina in the 2012 provincial election in the Bečej electoral division. He was defeated in the second round. 

He also appeared in the lead position on a coalition electoral list for the Bečej municipal assembly in the concurrent 2012 Serbian local elections and was elected when the list won eight mandates. The Democratic Party won a minority victory in election, but the Progressives were able to form coalition government with the Alliance of Vojvodina Hungarians with Radojević as mayor. He served in this role for the next four years, led the Progressive alliance to a majority victory in Bečej in the 2016 Serbian local elections, and was chosen for a second term as mayor following the election. 

His second term as mayor was very brief; days after the appointment, a new government of Vojvodina was announced and Radojević was named as provincial agriculture minister. In October 2016, he announced loans of 132 million dinars to agricultural producers. In subsequent years, he travelled to Israel and Cyprus to discuss potential agricultural investments in Serbia and Vojvodina. In an interview toward the end of his term in 2020, he said that more young people in Serbia were becoming involved with agricultural production. He stood down from the provincial cabinet after the 2020 Vojvodina provincial election.

Radojević again led the Progressive Party's coalition list for Bečej in the 2020 Serbian local elections and was re-elected when the list won another majority victory. As of 2021, he continues to serve as a member of the municipal assembly.

Electoral record

Provincial (Vojvodina)

References

1978 births
Living people
People from Bečej
Mayors of places in Serbia
Government ministers of Vojvodina
Serbian Progressive Party politicians